Donald Hugh Walker (born 29 November 1951) is an Australian musician and songwriter who wrote many of the hits for Australian pub rock band Cold Chisel. 
Walker is considered to be one of Australia's best songwriters. In 2012 he was inducted into the Australian Songwriter's Hall of Fame.

He played piano and keyboard with the Cold Chisel from 1973 to 1983, when they disbanded. He has since continued to record and tour, both solo, initially under the name Catfish and as Tex, Don and Charlie, and worked as a songwriter for others. In 2009, he released his first book.

Richard Clapton describes Walker as, "the most Australian writer there has ever been. Don just digs being a sort of Beat poet, who goes around observing, especially around the streets of Kings Cross. He soaks it up like a sponge and articulates it so well. Quite frankly, I think he's better than the rest of us."

Biography

1951–1972: Early life and family
Walker was born in Ayr, Queensland to a farmer father and schoolteacher mother. His grandfather had served at Gallipoli in World War I, and then at the Battle of Pozières, where he was shot in the face. Returning to Australia, he married the sister of his best friend, who had died in the same battle.

Walker's father was a harmonica player and fan of Larry Adler. Walker said, "He was always very keen on gospel and blues music, and 30s swing. I was familiar with that before I could talk." He said his father was in, "the AIF in Palestine and Syria in WW2 and in what was then Ceylon and three tours of New Guinea." He owned a cane farm on Rita Island on the Burdekin River, where Walker lived until the age of 4. His family later moved to Grafton, where a local piano teacher, Dot Morris, taught him, "a little bit of Chopin.....a lot of Fats Waller repertoire, and also Winifred Atwell." Later, he, "got into organ and the main influences were Stevie Winwood's 60s stuff and Ray Manzarek."

Having completed a degree in physics in the 1970s at the University of New England residing at Robb College. Walker was working for the Weapons Research Establishment, when he helped form Cold Chisel in 1973.

1973–1983: Cold Chisel

Cold Chisel are an Australian pub rock band, formed in 1973. From the earliest days, Walker was a creative songwriting force for the band. He became known for his passionate and raw lyrical observations on the Australian society and culture of the time. His songwriting credits include the hit singles "Flame Trees," "Saturday Night," "Choirgirl,""Goodbye (Astrid Goodbye)", "Cheap Wine," and the Australian Vietnam war song "Khe Sanh" (voted the 8th greatest Australian song of all time by the Australasian Performing Right Association in 2001).

During his time with Cold Chisel, Walker produced his first work outside the band, the soundtrack of the Australian movie "Freedom", directed by Scott Hicks. The soundtrack was released as an album and featured members of Cold Chisel and Michael Hutchence. The Age described it as, "the best rock music written for an Australian movie."

1983–1991: hiatus & Catfish

After Cold Chisel disbanded in 1983, Walker had a five-year hiatus before resuming recording and performing. Initially, he had considered hiring an actor to mime the songs before deciding to front Catfish himself  Ostensibly a band, Catfish was in effect a solo project, featuring Walker on vocals, keyboards and penning all the songs. Catfish featured various backing musicians, such as Charlie Owen, Ian Moss, Ricky Fataar and harmonica player David Blight.

The first album, Unlimited Address, released in 1989, showed a jazzier, Eastern European side to Walker's songwriting, reflecting his travels during the previous years. Despite being critically lauded, sales were moderate, the album reaching number 49 in the national charts. The second album, Ruby was a return to Australia in sound and lyrical subject matter. Again, it was well received by critics but sold relatively poorly. The track "Charleville" was later to receive country music awards when covered by Slim Dusty.

1992–present: Tex, Don and Charlie

In early 1992, Walker featured in an acoustic live performance for alternative radio station JJJ with Charlie Owen, James Cruickshank and Tex Perkins. Six months later, Perkins proposed to Walker that they record an album together. Walker described the recording as a number of informal afternoons spent jamming in the studio. "It wasn't an album approached with any sort of seriousness. It wasn't until we had it all done that we started to realise we might have something special."

In 1993 Tex, Don and Charlie released their first album, Sad but True on Red Eye Records. The record, an acoustic country-tinged affair, returned Walker to some level of popular awareness and received rave reviews in magazines like Australian Rolling Stone. About half the songs were written by Walker, including "Sitting in a Bar". The band toured strongly on the back of the album, later releasing a live album Monday Morning Coming Down..., featuring tracks from Sad But True.

2005 saw the release of a third Tex, Don and Charlie album, All is Forgiven, similar in style to the first. Again, Walker wrote about half the songs, including "Harry was a Bad Bugger", described by Chris Johnston as, "the Australian song of the year", and by Mess & Noise as, "one of the finest Australian compositions of the last 20 years." The album was shortlisted for the inaugural Australian Music Prize.

The trio continue to release music, including their 2017 album, You Don't Know Lonely, which peaked at number 14 on the ARIA Charts.

1995–present: Solo career
In 1995, Walker's released his debut studio album under his own name, We're All Gunna Die. He stated that it was the first album to carry his name as, "it was the first record that finished up how I wanted it." Rehearsal sessions were held over four afternoons in Walker's lounge room, and all songs were recorded in 3 takes or less. The band featured David Blight, Garrett Costigan on pedal-steel guitar and Red Rivers on guitar. The music was a ragged mix of country, Chicago blues and balladry, and featured the song "Eternity".

Commencing in 2005, Walker toured Australia occasionally with his backing band, The Suave Fucks (named after a line from Blue Velvet). They featured Roy Payne on baritone guitar, Michael Vidale on bass, Hamish Stuart on drums, Garrett Costigan, and Glen Hannah on guitar until his death in 2019.

In 2009, Walker published his first book, Shots. It was an autobiographical collection of smaller pieces, rarely more than a few pages in length. The subject matter was mostly recollections of rural Australia or life with Cold Chisel before they became famous. A separate piece by Walker had previously been included in The Best Australian Essays collection for 2007. Shots received a number of positive reviews: The Age described the memoir as "a whip crack across a landscape of rural Australia, lonely highways and endless gigs;" in the Australian Book Review it was called "a quite wonderful book [that] blasts away every last vestige of the crude, boozy, foot-stomping, flag-waving Australiana that has until now enveloped the Cold Chisel story like a filthy smog, leaving behind only the simmering highways, the trashy motels, the dank pubs and the monotonous suburbs of a nation slouching apathetically through the remnants of the 20th century." Readings from Shots, as performed by Walker, were aired on Radio National throughout late 2009.

In 2011, Walker released his first live album, Live in Queenscliff. The album features a performance with The Suave Fucks at the 2006 Queenscliff Music Festival.

In August 2013, Walker released Hully Gully, which was recorded with the Suave Fucks over a decade. Joe Henry was asked to mix the album because Walker was impressed by his work on the Allen Toussaint album The Bright Mississippi, saying, "it sounded like Duke Ellington produced by Jimmy Page. I just fell in love with the record." Named after a simple 60s dance, it was thought by some to be his best album to date, but failed to chart.

In March 2018, Walker released a six-album vinyl box set of his solo back catalogue. Five of the albums had never been on vinyl before, with Walker saying "It's a way of reviewing the whole catalogue, without doing a best-of."

In 2019 Walker released the book Songs; a publication of Walker solo work and collaborations over 40 years from Cold Chisel to Tex, Don & Charlie and his solo albums.

Collaborations
Walker has worked with many other artists, most notably with song writing credits on Ian Moss' hit album, Matchbook and Jimmy Barnes' top ten single "Stone Cold". He has written with or had songs recorded by TOFOG, Jimmy Little, Kate Ceberano, Wendy Matthews, Wes Carr, Troy Cassar-Daley, Graeme Connors, Anne Kirkpatrick, Mick Harvey, Missy Higgins, Busby Marou, Melinda Schneider, Sarah Blasko, Katie Noonan, Jeff Lang, Normie Rowe and Adam Brand. Two Walker-penned songs appeared on The Very Best of Slim Dusty, which stayed in the Australian country charts for over 15 years. He also produced Moss' album Petrolhead.

Personal life
He is the brother of the Australian novelist, Brenda Walker and son of Australian novelist Shirley Walker. He is a Brisbane Broncos supporter.

Discography

Studio albums

Live albums

Box Set

Singles

See also 
 Tex, Don and Charlie

Awards and nominations

APRA Awards
The APRA Awards are held in Australia and New Zealand by the Australasian Performing Right Association to recognise songwriting skills, sales and airplay performance by its members annually. Walker has won one award from five nominations.

|-
| rowspan="3"| 2001
|"Good Friends" by Adam Brand (written by Don Walker & Myles Walker)
| rowspan="2"| Most Performed Country Work of the Year
| 
|-
| rowspan="2"| "Looking Forward Looking Back" by Slim Dusty (written by Don Walker)
| 
|-
| Song of the Year
| 
|-
| 2008
| "Everything's Going to Be Alright" by Adam Brand (written by Adam Brand, Sam Hawksley & Don Walker)
| Country Work of the Year
| 
|-
| 2009
| "Coming From / Khe Sanh" by Troy Cassar-Daley (written by Troy Cassar-Daley & Don Walker)
| Country Work of the Year
| 
|-
| 2012 
| "All for You" by Cold Chisel (Don Walker)
| Song of the Year
| 
| 
|-
| 2014
| "Luck" by Busby Marou (written by Thomas Busby and Don Walker)
| Blues and Roots Work of the Year
| 
|-
| rowspan="2"| 2016
| Cold Chisel (Jimmy Barnes, Ian Moss, Don Walker, Phil Small and Steve Prestwich)
| Ted Albert Award for Outstanding Services to Australian Music
| 
|-
|  "Lost" (Don Walker, Wes Carr) || Song of the Year ||  
|-
| rowspan="2"| 2021 ||rowspan="2"| "Getting the Band Back Together" (Don Walker) || Most Performed Rock Work || 
|-
| Song of the Year
| 
|-

ARIA Music Awards
The ARIA Music Awards is an annual awards ceremony that recognises excellence, innovation, and achievement across all genres of Australian music. They commenced in 1987.

! 
|-
| rowspan="2"| 1989
|  Unlimited Address
| ARIA Award for Breakthrough Artist – Album
| 
| rowspan="2"|
|-
| "When You Dance"
| ARIA Award for Breakthrough Artist – Single
| 
|-
| 1990
| "Tucker's Daughter" (written by Ian Moss and Don Walker)
| ARIA Award for Song of the Year
| 
| 
|-

Australian Songwriter's Hall of Fame
The Australian Songwriters Hall of Fame was established in 2004 to honour the lifetime achievements of some of Australia's greatest songwriters.

|-
| 2012
| himself
| Australian Songwriter's Hall of Fame
| 
|}

TV Week / Countdown Awards
Countdown was an Australian pop music TV series on national broadcaster ABC-TV from 1974–1987, it presented music awards from 1979–1987, initially in conjunction with magazine TV Week. The TV Week / Countdown Awards were a combination of popular-voted and peer-voted awards.

|-
| 1979
| Don Walker - "Choirgirl" by Cold Chisel
| Best Recorded Songwriter
| 
|-
| 1980
| Don Walker (Cold Chisel)
| Best Recorded Songwriter
| 
|-
| 1984
| Don Walker (Cold Chisel)
| Best Songwriter
| 
|-

Footnotes

External links 
 Don Walker's Official Website

1951 births
APRA Award winners
Australian keyboardists
Australian male singers
Australian pianists
Australian songwriters
Cold Chisel members
Living people
Musicians from Queensland
Musicians from Sydney
Tex, Don and Charlie members
Male pianists